United States Forces – Iraq (USF-I) was an American military sub-unified command, part of U.S. Central Command.  It was stationed in Iraq as agreed with the Government of Iraq under the U.S.–Iraq Status of Forces Agreement.  USF–I replaced the previous commands Multi-National Force – Iraq, Multi-National Corps – Iraq, and Multi-National Security Transition Command – Iraq from January 2010. General Raymond T. Odierno initially served as commanding general but he was replaced by General Lloyd Austin in September of 2010. The logo of the USF-I depicts a lamassu.

Background
United States Forces – Iraq was the military component of the American and Iraqi bilateral relationship, responsible for defense and security cooperation. The U.S.–Iraq Strategic Framework Agreement reads:
In order to strengthen security and stability in Iraq, and thereby contribute to international peace and stability, and to enhance the ability of the Republic of Iraq to deter all threats against its sovereignty, security, and territorial integrity, the Parties shall continue to foster close cooperation concerning defense and security arrangements without prejudice to Iraqi sovereignty over its land, sea, and air territory.

While the United States occupied Iraq between the toppling of the Ba'athist Iraqi government and the dissolution of the Coalition Provisional Authority on 28 June 2004, and thereafter maintained security under a U.N. mandate requested by the Transitional Government of Iraq, since 1 January 2009, the Government of Iraq has full responsibility for security in all of Iraq. Consequently, United States Forces – Iraq did not have responsibility for, nor control of, any ground in Iraq. Its mission was limited to defense and security cooperation only.

History
During 2008 and 2009, all non-U.S. foreign forces withdrew from Iraq. Withdrawal of all non-U.S. forces was complete by 31 July 2009. As of 1 January 2009, the Iraqi government became fully responsible, through its security ministries, for maintaining and providing security and rule of law for its populace. Furthermore, as of 28 June 2009, no foreign forces were stationed within any of Iraq's major cities. The United States decided after negotiations to cease combat operations, that is, patrolling, serving arrest warrants, route clearance, etc., within Iraq by 1 September 2010, and transition to a pure advise, train and assist role. The changing mission entailed major troop reductions; from 115,000 on 15 December 2009, to 50,000 by 1 September 2010, and to zero by 31 December 2011.

As a result of the evolution of Operation Iraqi Freedom, three major commands (Multi-National Force – Iraq, Multi-National Corps – Iraq and Multi-National Security Transition Command – Iraq) were merged on 1 January 2010. The streamlining reduced the total number of staff positions by 41%, and serves the new advise, train and assist role of the U.S. forces under the U.S.–Iraq Strategic Framework Agreement. The reduced number of staff positions decreased the personnel requirements on the United States armed forces. This also meant that further space was created for the reconstitution of the U.S. military after the end of significant combat operations. (This reconstitution may include, for example, longer leave for many personnel, enhanced space for psychological counselling, equipment repair and maintenance, transport of enormous amounts of equipment, supplies, and materiel south to Kuwait and onward, reconsideration of requirements, etc.).

The new USF–I was claimed to be organized into three divisions, which as of January 2010 were actually four. United States Division – North took over from the former MND–N, United States Division – Center takes over from United States Force – West and MND–Baghdad, amalgamated on 23 January 2010,  and United States Division – South, took over from the old MND–South. In December 2009-January 2010 when the transition occurred, the 34th Infantry Division was providing the headquarters of MND/USD South. On 3 February 2010, the 1st Infantry Division took command of USD–South (covering nine Governorates of Iraq, including Wasit Governorate and Babil Governorate) from the 34th Infantry Division. A number of Advise and Assist (A&A) Brigades were created to carry out the Advise and Assist mission. Advise and Assist brigades were "standard combat brigades with a complement of forty-eight extra majors and colonels to serve as advisers to Iraqi troops."

MNSTC–I became U.S. Forces – Iraq, Advising and Training, which was under a major general (Jane's Defence Weekly, January 2010), double-hatted as Commander, NATO Training Mission – Iraq (NTM–I).

Withdrawals
 1 January 2009The U.S.–Iraq Status of Forces Agreement went into effect, and gave the Government of Iraq de jure responsibility of maintaining and providing security for all of its people. Approximately 150,000 foreign troops in Iraq.
 28 June 2009Foreign forces were no longer stationed within any of Iraq's major cities. Proclaimed as a national holiday by Iraqi Prime Minister Nouri al-Maliki.
 31 July 2009The last large groups of non-U.S. foreign forces completed their withdrawal from Iraq.
 1 January 2010The major commands Multi-National Force – Iraq, Multi-National Corps – Iraq and Multi-National Security Transition Command – Iraq merged into the unified command United States Forces – Iraq, reducing the total number of staff positions by 41%. Approximately 112,000 U.S. troops in Iraq.
 7 March 2010Iraq held parliamentary elections, its second under its democratic constitution, and is seen as an important milestone for the young Iraqi political system; this leaves approximately 96,000 U.S. troops in Iraq.
 1 September 2010American forces ceased all combat operations, i.e. patrolling, serving arrest warrants, route clearance, etc., and transitioned to a pure advise, train and assist role. Operation Iraqi Freedom is officially concluded, and the advise and assist mission continues under Operation New Dawn. 49,700 U.S. troops in Iraq.
 31 December 2011American forces complete their withdrawal from Iraq, leaving no U.S. military forces in the country. All security responsibilities were then assumed by the Iraqi Armed Forces and other security agencies, including the Iraqi interior ministry. The Office of Security Cooperation within the United States Embassy in Baghdad took up the remaining DOD training, equipment sales, and follow-on support functions.

References

External links
 

Iraq–United States relations
Military units and formations of the Iraq War
Commands of the United States Armed Forces
Military units and formations established in 2010
Military units and formations disestablished in 2011